The Gramado Film Festival is an international film festival held annually in the Brazilian city of Gramado, Rio Grande do Sul, since 1973. In 1992, the festival began to award Latin American films produced outside of Brazil. It is the biggest film festival in the country.

History
Formed by the National Cinema Institute (Instituto Nacional de Cinema - INC) in January 1973, the Gramado Film Festival was originally launched at the Hydrangeas Festivity (Festa das Hortênsias), where film exhibitions were promoted between 1969 and 1971. The efforts of the artistic community, the press, tourists, and locals made the initiative a successful event. By the 1980s, it was already the most important film festival of Brazil.

Awards

Currently, the festival grants awards in 24 categories (13 for Brazilian films, eight for international films, and three special awards). Its awards, called "Kikitos", are 13 inch statuettes created by the artisan Elisabeth Rosenfeld.

Brazilian motion pictures
 Best Picture
 Best Director
 Best Actor
 Best Actress
 Best Supporting Actor
 Best Supporting Actress
 Best Screenplay
 Best Film Editing
 Best Photography
 Best Original Music Score
 Best Art Direction
 Special Jury Award
 Popular Jury Award

Latin motion pictures
 Best Picture
 Best Director
 Best Actor
 Best Actress
 Best Screenplay
 Special Jury Award
 Critics Award
 Popular Jury Award

Special awards
 Troféu Oscarito
 Troféu Eduardo Abelin
 Troféu Cidade de Gramado

See also 
Cinema of Brazil

External links 
 Gramado Tourism Guide
 
Complete coverage of the Gramado Film Festival
 Gramado City Guide

Film festivals in Brazil
Festivals in Gramado
Film festivals established in 1973
1973 establishments in Brazil